Park Chan-young may refer to:

Park Chan-young (handballer) (born 1983), South Korean handball player
Park Chan-young (footballer) (born 1986), South Korean footballer

See also
 Park Chae-young
 Park Chan-yong (disambiguation)